Ely Bruce Dewing (June 21, 1834 – August 7, 1902) was an American merchant and politician.

Born in French Creek, Chautauqua County, New York, Dewing moved to Elkhorn, Wisconsin Territory in 1843, From 1847 to 1854, Dewing lived in St. Joseph County, Michigan and then returned to Elkhorn. Ely held various county, town, and village offices and was a Republican. In 1879, Dewing served in the Wisconsin State Assembly. Dewing died at his home in Elkhorn, Wisconsin.

Notes

External links
 Works with text by Dewing, E. B. on IMSLP

1834 births
1902 deaths
People from Chautauqua County, New York
People from Elkhorn, Wisconsin
People from St. Joseph County, Michigan
Businesspeople from Wisconsin
Republican Party members of the Wisconsin State Assembly
19th-century American politicians
19th-century American businesspeople